Witchy is a fantasy webcomic by Ariel Slamet Ries that started in 2014. The webcomic follows the young witch Nyneve in a world where magical proficiency is based on the length of one's hair. Though the world of Witchy is culturally and ethnically diverse, its characters are marginalized based on their hair length. Ries uploads one page of the webcomic per week as she is studying animation. Witchy was nominated for an Ignatz award in 2015.

Synopsis
The webcomic Witchy is set in a world where the length of one's hair indicates the magical proficiency one has, and people with long hair are considered enemies of the state. Witchy follows the story of the young witch Nyneve, whose long-haired father was burned at the stake by the kingdom's royal "Witch Guard" while she was still a child. As she grows older, Nyneve has to decide whether she will accept being conscripted into the Witch Guard or go rogue. She hides the length of her hair while outside of her house to avoid conscription, while her classmates at school each have their own problems and ambitions.

Ziah Grace of Comics Alliance described Witchy as a webcomic about the systems of a society: "both the ability of a widespread system to continue and the ability of the individual to survive within them." Grace describes Nyneve as the "product of a society that grinds up outliers." Nyneve's situation is contrasted with that of her classmate Prill, who finds herself much more accepted into the society but who feels ostracized at home.

Development
Ariel Ries is an animation student at The Animation Workshop in Denmark and Witchy is her first major project. She wrote the story for her webcomic during 2012 and 2013: Witchy was originally intended to be a short story about a witch village where witches were slowly disappearing into the surrounding woods. The hair-based hierarchy was centered on color at the time, and the protagonist would dye her hair to disguise the fact that she was weak. Ries decided to go with hair length instead after a friend brought up the idea, and she wanted to create a society where prejudice was not based on race, gender, sexuality, or disability. Witchy was initially very derivative  of the fantasy works by Jean Giraud, but Ries later decided she wanted her webcomic to be inspired by Asia rather than Europe. Ries created the kingdom in which Witchy takes place as a very ethnically-diverse place; she has stated that she imagines it as a "sort of Asian melting pot kingdom."

As a student, Ries almost exclusively works on Witchy during the weekend; if she wasn't able to finish the inking and coloring of a page on Sunday, she would "chip away" at it for the rest of the week. Witchy updates every Tuesday, but Ries has a two-week buffer in place in case she can't finish a page in time. Ries is invested in the representation of characters that are underrepresented in media, which inspired her to include characters of various ethnicities, as well as a transgender character. In an interview with Comics Alliance, Ries noted that she failed to properly plan its magic system when she started creating Witchy, resulting in her being caught by surprise when she got to drawing this aspect of her webcomic. The magic system is primarily inspired by various Asian religions, such as Shintoism and Mun, as well as the rules and techniques of several different dance styles and martial arts. Ries stated that she has many ideas she wants to incorporate for Witchys magic system, but has had difficulty organizing her concepts properly.

During the development of Witchy, Ries has switched over from using traditional ink for her artwork, to using Adobe Photoshop and later Clip Studio Paint. As Witchy is Ries' first major project, she aimed to be open to experimentation, and Ries has stated that her artstyle has gradually shifted over time. Ries plans for the plot have similarly changed over time, as her priority towards character growth adjusted greatly. According to Ries, developing the story very slowly has helped her improve the plot, as she has months to work out problems.

In March 2019, Lion Forge Comics announced a print collection of Witchy, to be published beginning in September 2019.

Reception
Grace of Comics Alliance stated that Ries' art is "wonderfully developed", likening the backgrounds of Witchy to those in the films of Hayao Miyazaki and comparing the scratchy and detailed linework to that of Jake Wyatt's Necropolis. Grace described Witchy as "an incredible first project from a rising talent." Mey of Autostraddle praised Witchys worldbuilding and its original set of rules for its magic system. Mey particularly praised the transgender girl Prill, who behaves fairly bossy and snarky throughout the webcomic. Sarah Hunter of The Booklist Reader remarked that Ries "inflects the characters and universe of Hyalin with issues and concerns that will resonate with contemporary readers."

In 2015, Witchy was nominated for an Ignatz award in the "Outstanding Online Comic" category.

References

External links
 

2010s webcomics
2014 webcomic debuts
Fantasy webcomics
Australian webcomics
Danish webcomics
LGBT-related webcomics
Transgender-related comics
Fiction about witchcraft
Webcomics in print
2010s LGBT literature